Neemgaon is a village in the Mat Block in the Mathura district of the Indian state of Uttar Pradesh.

Geography
It has an average elevation of 175 m (574 ft).

References

Villages in Mathura district